Louis-Emile Durandelle (14 February 1839 – 12 March 1917) was a French architectural photographer. Durandelle is best known for his documentary photographs of the construction of Parisian buildings, including the Eiffel tower and the Paris Opera.

Career
From 1854 to 1862 he worked with Hyacinthe César Delmaet and Dalmaet's wife Clémence Jacob as the company Delmaet & Durandelle. The trio lived and worked from 30-32 Chaussé de Cligancourt in Paris. After the death of Delmaet in 1862, Durandelle married Dalmaet's widow, who kept the name Clémence Jacob Dalmaet.

By 1868 the company was operating from 4 Rue du Faubourg Montmartre. Following Delmaet's death, Durandelle documented the construction of the Hotel-Dieu de Paris, Sacre Cour, the Bibliothèque nationale de France, the theater at Monte Carlo and the 1882-1884 excavations under the Louvre Museum. In 1871 Between 1870 and 1871
he photographed the Paris Commune, the insurrection against the government of Napoleon III.

Durandelle published a portfolio in 1876, in collaboration with Charles Garnier, titled Le Nouvel Opéra de Paris: Sculpture ornementale, documenting the Paris Opéra's sculptural decoration. He photographed the construction of the Eiffel Tower from 1887 until 1889.

After the death of his wife in 1890, Dandurelle sold the photography business, along with its negatives, to his assistant and stopped taking photographs.

Collections
Art Institute of Chicago
Canadian Centre for Architecture
Cité de l'Architecture et du Patrimoine, Paris
Getty Museum
Metropolitan Museum of Art
Minneapolis Institute of Arts
Nelson-Atkins Museum of Art
Musée d'Orsay, Paris
Museum of Modern Art, New York
National Gallery of Art, Washington
National Gallery of Canada
San Francisco Museum of Modern Art

Gallery

References

1839 births
1917 deaths
19th-century French photographers
Architectural photographers